Catasticta is a genus of Neotropical butterflies in the family Pieridae. The genus was erected by Arthur Gardiner Butler in 1870.

Species
Subgenus Catasticta Butler, 1870
The flisa species group
Catasticta bithys (Hübner, 1831)
Catasticta flisa (Herrich-Schäffer, 1858)
Catasticta huebneri Lathy & Rosenberg, 1912
Catasticta nimbice (Boisduval, 1836)
Catasticta theresa Butler & H. Druce, 1874
The sisamnus species group
Catasticta hegemon Godman & Salvin, 1889
Catasticta lisa Baumann & Reissinger, 1969
Catasticta prioneris (Hopffer, 1874)
Catasticta sibyllae Nakahara, Padrón & MacDonald, 2018
Catasticta sisamnus (Fabricius, 1793)
The notha species group
Catasticta corcyra (C. Felder & R. Felder, 1859)
Catasticta eurigania (Hewitson, 1870)
Catasticta notha (Doubleday, 1847)
Catasticta pieris (Hopffer, 1874)
Subgenus Archonoia Reissinger, 1972
The ctemene species group
Catasticta ctemene (Hewitson, 1869)
Catasticta hebra (Lucas, 1852)
The teutamis species group
Catasticta pharnakia (Fruhstorfer, 1907)
Catasticta teutamis (Hewitson, 1860)
The grisea species group
Catasticta grisea Joicey & Rosenberg, 1915
Catasticta huancabambensis Joicey & Rosenberg, 1915
Catasticta pluvius Tessmann, 1928
Catasticta potameoides Reissinger, 1972
Catasticta sella Eitschberger & Racheli, 1998
The colla species group
Catasticta chelidonis (Hopffer, 1874)
Catasticta colla (Doubleday, 1847)
Catasticta ludovici Eitschberger & Racheli, 1998
Subgenus Catasticta
The susiana species group 
Catasticta collina F. Brown, 1939
Catasticta sinapina Butler, 1896
Catasticta pillcopata (Bollino, 2008)
Catasticta radiata (Kollar, 1850)
Catasticta reducta Butler, 1896
Catasticta susiana (Hopffer, 1874)
Catasticta scaeva Röber, 1909
The philone species group
Catasticta anaitis (Hewitson, 1869)
Catasticta discalba F. Brown & Gabriel, 1939
Catasticta distincta Lathy & Rosenberg, 1912
Catasticta frontina F. Brown & Gabriel, 1939
Catasticta leucophaea Lathy & Rosenberg, 1912
Catasticta nimbata Joicey & Talbot, 1918
Catasticta philone (C. Felder & R. Felder, 1865)
Catasticta pyrczi Bollino, 2008
Catasticta smithia F. Brown & Gabriel, 1939
Catasticta suadela (Hopffer, 1874)
Catasticta suasa Röber, 1908
The aureomaculata species group
Catasticta aureomaculata Lathy & Rosenberg, 1912
Catasticta ferra F. Brown & Gabriel, 1939
Catasticta modesta (Lucas, 1852)
Catasticta philais (C. Felder & R. Felder, 1865)
Catasticta philothea (C. Felder & R. Felder, 1865)
Catasticta rileya F. Brown & Gabriel, 1939
Catasticta tamsa F. Brown & Gabriel, 1939
The manco species group
Catasticta fulva Joicey & Rosenberg, 1915
Catasticta incerta (Dognin, 1888)
Catasticta lanceolata Lathy & Rosenberg, 1912
Catasticta lycurgus Godman & Salvin, 1880
Catasticta manco (Doubleday, 1848)
Catasticta philoscia (C. Felder & R. Felder, 1861)
Catasticta pinava (Doubleday, 1847)
Catasticta scurra Röber, 1924
The troezene species group
Catasticta affinis Röber, 1909
Catasticta gelba F. Brown & Gabriel, 1939
Catasticta giga F. Brown & Gabriel, 1939
Catasticta philodora F. Brown, 1939
Catasticta seitzi Lathy & Rosenberg, 1912
Catasticta troezene (C. Felder & R. Felder, 1865)
Catasticta watkinsi Lathy & Rosenberg, 1912
Subgenus Hesperochoia Reissinger, 1972
The poujadei species group
Catasticta eximia Röber, 1909
Catasticta poujadei (Dognin, 1887)
Catasticta revancha Rey & Pyrcz, 1996
The chrysolopha species group
Catasticta atahuallpa (Eitschberger & Racheli, 1998)
Catasticta chrysolopha (Kollar, 1850)
Catasticta cora (Lucas, 1852)
Catasticta similis Lathy & Rosenberg, 1912
Catasticta superba Lathy & Rosenberg, 1912
Catasticta truncata Lathy & Rosenberg, 1912
The toca species group
Catasticta apaturina Butler, 1901
Catasticta tamina Röber, 1909
Catasticta thomasorum Jasinski, 1998
Catasticta toca (Doubleday, 1847)
Catasticta tomyris (C. Felder & R. Felder, 1865)
The teutila species group
Catasticta duida F. Brown, 1932
Catasticta teutila (Doubleday, 1847)
Subgenus Leodontoia Reissinger, 1972
The cerberus species group
Catasticta cerberus Godman & Salvin, 1889
The amastris species group
Catasticta abiseo Lamas & Bollino, 2004
Catasticta amastris (Hewitson, 1874)
Catasticta marcapita Röber, 1909
Catasticta paucartambo (Eitschberger & Racheli, 1998)
Catasticta semiramis (Lucas, 1852)
Catasticta socorrensis Fassl, 1915
Catasticta striata (Eitschberger & Racheli, 1998)
Catasticta vilcabamba Lamas & Bollino, 2004
The cinerea species group
Catasticta cinerea Butler, 1897
Catasticta coerulescens Eitschberger & Racheli, 1998
Catasticta rochereaui Le Cerf, 1924
The albofasciata species group
Catasticta albofasciata Lathy & Rosenberg, 1912
Catasticta tricolor Butler, 1897
Catasticta uricoecheae (C. Felder & R. Felder, 1861)
Catasticta vulnerata Butler, 1897
The rosea species group
Catasticta arborardens Reissinger, 1972
Catasticta rosea Joicey & Rosenberg, 1915

References

External links
"Genus Catasticta". Butterflies of America.

Pierini
Pieridae of South America
Pieridae genera
Taxa named by Per Olof Christopher Aurivillius